Rudolf Belin (born 4 November 1942) is a Croatian retired football manager and player.

Club career
Belin started his career with Dinamo Zagreb in 1960, where he won the Yugoslav Cup three times and the 1967 Inter-Cities Fairs Cup, beating the English side Leeds United and went on to make 410 appearances for the club until 1970, when he moved to Beerschot VAC in Belgium and he spent two years. He was voted Croatia’s 36th footballer of the century in 2000 chosen by Večernji List.

International career
He made his debut for Yugoslavia in an October 1963 friendly match away against Romania and earned a total of 29 caps scoring 6 goals. His final international was an October 1969 World Cup qualification match against Belgium. He also was a participant at the 1968 European Championship.

Managerial career
After retiring, he graduated from the Physical Education School at the University of Zagreb, becoming a coach, while he also spent a considerable time acting as Director of Dinamo's Youth Football Academy and also coached Toronto Croatia in Canada, during 1998.

Belin coached the Iraq national team in 2001.

References

External links
 
 
 
 
 Serbia national football team website 

1942 births
Living people
Footballers from Zagreb
Association football defenders
Yugoslav footballers
Yugoslavia international footballers
Olympic footballers of Yugoslavia
Footballers at the 1964 Summer Olympics
UEFA Euro 1968 players
GNK Dinamo Zagreb players
K. Beerschot V.A.C. players
Yugoslav First League players
Belgian Pro League players
Yugoslav expatriate footballers
Expatriate footballers in Belgium
Yugoslav expatriate sportspeople in Belgium
Yugoslav football managers
Croatian football managers
GNK Dinamo Zagreb managers
Toronto Croatia managers
Yugoslav First League managers
Canadian Soccer League (1998–present) managers
Iraq national football team managers
Croatian expatriate football managers
Expatriate soccer managers in Canada
Croatian expatriate sportspeople in Canada
Expatriate football managers in Iraq
Croatian expatriate sportspeople in Iraq